Julio Díaz may refer to:
Julio Díaz (footballer) (born 1948), Spanish footballer
Julio Diaz (actor) (born 1958), Filipino actor
Julio Díaz (boxer) (born 1979), Mexican boxer